Vaakevandring is the debut EP by the Norwegian unblack symphonic black metal band Vaakevandring, released in 2004 through Momentum Scandinavia. It contains three re-mastered songs from their 1999 demo plus one additional demo track entitled "To Find The Eternal Peace".

The songs on Vaakevandring were produced in 1998-1999 by Stian Aarstad of Dimmu Borgir. Keyboard is a dominant instrument on the EP, and the overall output is symphonic, epic, melodic and folk-influenced. "Fader Vaar" is an adaptation of the Lord's Prayer in Norwegian language. "Og Sorgen Stilnet I Smertens Vann" is also sung in Norwegian.

Track listing

"Fader Vaar" - 6:39
"Some Day" - 4:19 
"Og Sorgen Stilnet I Smertens Vann" - 6:06
"To Find Eternal Peace" - 4:03

References

External links
Vaakevandring EP at Metal-Archives.
Vaakevandring EP at Firestream.net

2004 debut EPs
Symphonic black metal EPs
Vaakevandring albums